Reference Re Public Service Employee Relations Act (Alta), [1987] 1 S.C.R. 313 is a leading opinion of the Supreme Court of Canada on right to freedom of association under section 2(d) of the Canadian Charter of Rights and Freedoms. The Court held that section 2(d) does not include the right to strike.

Background
The province of Alberta referred a reference question to the Alberta Court of Appeal, which was eventually appealed to the Supreme Court. The questions concerned the constitutionality of prohibiting strikes and replacing them with compulsory arbitration.

Opinion of the Court
McIntyre, argued that the freedom of association is an individual right that protects collective activities which are already protected by individual rights. Thus, activities that are prohibited individually are also forbidden collectively. As such, a trade union cannot strike incident to a collective bargain.

Dickson, in dissent, also agreed with the characterization of the freedom, but argued that the right is not associated with particular activities but rather is "a freedom of persons to join and act with others in common pursuits".

Note that this case involved a "double-swing decision" where Dickson was assigned the reasons for the Court at conference but lost the signatures to McIntyre who then lost them to LeDain.

External links
 
 case summary

Canadian Charter of Rights and Freedoms case law
Supreme Court of Canada cases
Labour relations in Canada
1987 in Canadian case law
Supreme Court of Canada case articles without infoboxes
Supreme Court of Canada reference question cases